Jefferson Center, formerly known as the Aramark Tower and One Reading Center, is a high-rise office building located at 1101 Market Street in the Center City section of Philadelphia.

The building was originally conceived by the Reading Company while in a state of bankruptcy as a way to capitalize on its real estate holdings in Center City. Reading was granted development rights for the building along with a large parking complex in exchange for granting the city easements for developing the Jefferson Station (then Market East Station) entrance in the ground floor of the adjacent Reading Terminal.  Construction soon began and the building was completed in 1984. The building was designed by Bower Lewis Thrower (BLT) Architects of Philadelphia.

In 2018, Aramark vacated the building when the company relocated its headquarters to 2400 Market Street. In its place, Thomas Jefferson University and Jefferson Health became the primary tenant. Thomas Jefferson University occupies 14 floors of the 32 story building, which was renamed Jefferson Center.

See also

 List of tallest buildings in Philadelphia
 Buildings and architecture of Philadelphia

References

External links
 Emporis
 SkyscraperPage

Skyscraper office buildings in Philadelphia
Headquarters in the United States
Office buildings completed in 1984
1984 establishments in Pennsylvania